William Bulkeley (4 November 1691 – 28 October 1760) was a minor Welsh landowner, remembered chiefly as a diarist. He was born in Brynddu in the parish of Llanfechell, Anglesey, the son of William Bulkeley of Brynddu and of Lettice, daughter of Captain Henry Jones of Llangoed. He was sheriff of Anglesey in 1715. 

For many years he kept a meticulous diary. It was celebrated in 2014 with a dramatic performance at Brynddu house, still owned by one of  his descendants. 

Two volumes survive: the first from 30 March 1734 to 8 June 1743, and the second from 1 August 1747 to 28 September 1760. Every day he recorded his impression of the weather, but he also gives many details of estate management, local politics and religious upheaval, his patronage of harpists, cattle-dealing in the local fairs, his legal duties as justice of the peace, and his visit to Dublin. He seldom alludes to his business dealings, but in 1736 he refers to a debt and to money paid in London:

Family troubles
He also refers to the marital troubles of his daughter Mary, who in 1738 married Fortunatus Wright, merchant and privateer of Liverpool. 

 

Mary's troubles did not end with Fortunatus' death in 1756:

References

1691 births
1760 deaths
People from Anglesey
High Sheriffs of Anglesey
18th-century diarists